Kinosterninae is a subfamily of the family Kinosternidae, a family of aquatic turtles. Kinosterninae contains the genera Kinosternon and Sternotherus, which are native to much of the United States and northern Mexico.

References